The Bad Boy Family Reunion Tour was a joint concert tour headlined by Puff Daddy and featured various past and present artists from Bad Boy Entertainment. The tour earned $17.5 million from 19 shows, selling 208,508 tickets.

Background
To commemorate the label's 20th anniversary, Combs reunited with his former and current Bad Boy Family artists at the 2015 BET Awards for an all-star medley performance of the collective's many hits along with a new single, "Finna Get Loose" (with a special appearance from Pharrell Williams).

In April 2016, Combs announced a two-night Bad Boy Family Reunion show on May 20 & 21 at the Barclays Center in Brooklyn, New York City, which was also in commemoration of the late Notorious B.I.G.'s 44th birthday. The first show included performances from Combs, Mase, Faith Evans, 112, Total, The Lox, Carl Thomas, Lil' Kim, French Montana, Mario Winans, Cassie, Black Rob, Lil' Cease and Red Cafe. Special guest performances included Jay-Z, Nas, Usher, Mary J. Blige and Rick Ross. The second night special guest included Busta Rhymes, Fabolous, Desiigner, 2 Milly, DMX and Ty Dolla Sign.

In May 2016, a full tour was announced to begin August 2016. However, Combs suffered a shoulder injury and the tour was pushed back to September 2016.

Speaking on the tour, Combs stated:"This isn't just a concert—this is a moment in hip-hop and R&B history. The family and I are so excited to welcome fans into this once in a lifetime experience. This tour is 20 years in the making, and is a celebration of the hits and the Bad Boy lifestyle. The Bad Boy Family has set the standard for concert excellence, and this tour will be a testament to that!"

Critical reception
The tour received critical praise during its tenure in North America. Jewel Wicker (The Atlanta Journal-Constitution) called the show in Atlanta "insanely fun". She goes on to say: "But for nearly three hours Diddy and the acts he helped to become famous put on a seemingly endless show full of the massive party anthems and sexy love songs that defined Bad Boy Records' reign. Referring to the concert as a 'homecoming' show, the flashy star emphasized from the beginning that he was rolling out the red carpet for 'his second home'".

The performance in Miami was compared to a family reunion cookout. Tony Centeno (Miami New Times) states: "It hasn't always been a smooth road for Bad Boy, but they've found a way to survive. And they've continued to heed the advice of Biggie's mother, Voletta Wallace, who once had a bit of advice for her son in the intro to 'Sky's The Limit'". The show in Tampa was described as "wholly unnecessary but welcomed". Jay Cridlin of the Tampa Bay Times says: "He ain't Drake, but his Family Reunion was a comprehensive retrospective of a generation's worth of signature singles, a two-plus-hour hit parade that reminded everyone just why he once owned the top of the pops. [...] No, Diddy doesn't really need the Bad Boy Family Reunion in 2016. But it's something only he could've pulled off. Sway like that, even money can't buy".

Maura Johnston of The Boston Globe states the show in Boston took patrons on a retro ride to the 90s. She continues: "The nostalgia baked into the tracks he opened the show with helped, too. As Puff Daddy, Combs strung together a slew of pop-rap hits that flipped radio chestnuts into tableaus for his and his friends' boasts, sounding bright in a way that recalls a sweltering summer day when time, space, and, yes, sound, melt into one another". The concert in Las Vegas received four out of five stars from the Las Vegas Weekly. Mike Pizzo writes: " Without a doubt, the Bad Boy Family Reunion Tour will go down in history as one of the greatest hip-hop concerts of all time. You may have hated him back then, but you can't hate him now".

Performers

Main acts

Featured acts

Special guests
Brooklyn: Jay-Z, Nas, Usher, Mary J. Blige, Rick Ross, Cassie, Lil' Cease, Red Cafe, Busta Rhymes, Fabolous, Desiigner, 2 Milly, DMX, Ty Dolla Sign
Chicago: Chance the Rapper, Jeremih
New York City: Kanye West
Atlanta: Yung Joc, Gorilla Zoe, Boyz n da Hood, Young Jeezy, 2 Chainz, Gucci Mane, Jodeci, Tyrese Gibson
Miami: Kodak Black, Trina
Houston: Bun B
Philadelphia: Beanie Sigel
Oakland: Shyne, Miguel
Inglewood: Dr. Dre, Snoop Dogg, Nas, ASAP Rocky, ASAP Ferg, Jodeci, Mary J. Blige

Setlist
The following setlist was obtained from the concert held on September 15, 2016, at the Toyota Center in Houston, Texas. It does not represent all concerts for the duration of the tour. 

I—Puff Daddy
"Victory"
"O Let's Do It" (Remix)"
"Bad Boy for Life"
"Hate Me Now"
"I Get Money (Forbes 1,2,3 Remix)"
II—Puff Daddy & Mase
Can't Nobody Hold Me Down"
"Been Around the World"
III—112
"It's Over Now"
"Dance with Me"
"Peaches & Cream"
"Anywhere"
IV—Total
"Trippin'"
"No One Else"
"Tell Me"
"Kissin' You"
V—The Lox
"Mighty D-Block (2 Guns Up)"
"Last Day"
"We Gonna Make It" 
"Good Times" 
"Wild Out"
VI—Carl Thomas
"Emotional"
"Summer Rain"
"I Wish"
VII—Faith Evans
"No Other Love"
"I Love You"
"You Gets No Love"
"NYC" 
"You Used to Love Me"
"Soon as I Get Home"

VIII—French Montana
"Hot Nigga (Remix)"
"No Shopping"
"Ain't Worried About Nothin'"
"Ocho Cinco"
"Same Damn Time (Remix)" 
"Work (Remix)"
"Pop That"
IX—Lil' Kim
"Quiet Storm (Remix)"
"Big Momma Thang"
"No Time"
"Get Money"
"Lighters Up"
X—Various
"Feel So Good" 
"I Need a Girl (Part One)" / "I Need a Girl (Part Two)" 
"Cupid" 
XI—DMX
"What's My Name?"
"What These Bitches Want"
"Get at Me Dog"
"Ruff Ryders' Anthem"
"Party Up (Up in Here)"
XII—Bun B
"Draped Up"
"International Players Anthem (I Choose You)"
XIII—Finale
"Only You (Bad Boy Remix)" 
"Can't You See" 
"Love Like This" 
"Whoa!" 
"All the Way Up" 
"Wasting My Time" 
"It's All About the Benjamins" 
"I'll Be Missing You" 
"Mo Money Mo Problems"

Tour dates

Cancellations and rescheduled shows

Box office score data

References 

2016 concert tours
Faith Evans concert tours
Co-headlining concert tours